The Carlos Palanca Memorial Awards for Literature winners in 1966 (rank, title of winning entry, name of author).


Filipino division
Short story
First prize: “Bilanggo” by Wilfredo Pa. Virtusio
Second prize: “Ang Anino ng Kanyang Ama” by Pedro S. Dandan
Third prize: “Ang Dalaw” by Jeremias Victor Lacanieta

Poetry
First prize: “Ebolusyon” by Cresenciano C. Marquez Jr.
Second prize: “Logos” by Vict. Dela Cruz
Third prize: “Tinig Mula sa Kung Saan” by Rogelio Mangahas

One-act play
First prize: “Itim ang Kulay ng Paruparo” by Bernardo Del Rosario Jr.
Second prize: “Mga Kaluluwang Naghahanap” by Rogelio Sicat
Third prize: “Anino ng Kahapon” by Benjamin P. Pascual

English division
Short story
First prize: “Loverboy” by Lilia Pablo Amansec
Second prize: “A Various Season” by Kerima Polotan Tuvera
Third prize: “A Gift of Tongues” by Fr. Rodolfo Villanueva

Poetry
First prize: “Angels and Fugitives” by Emmanuel Torres
Second prize: “A Collection of Poems” by Valdemar Olaguer
Third prize: “After this Exile” by Manuel Viray

One-act play
First prize: “The Sign of the Sea Gulls” by Jesus T. Peralta
Second prize: “Flores Para Los Muertos” by Wilfrido D. Nolledo
Third prize: “O Lamb ... Poor Lamb” by Mar V. Puatu

References
 

Palanca Awards
1966 literary awards